Mina Vad is a village in Badakhshan Province in north-eastern Afghanistan.

Geography

Transport

See also
Badakhshan Province

References

External links
Satellite map at Maplandia.com

Populated places in Nusay District